The Jim and Janet Sinegal Center for Science and Innovation is a building on the Seattle University campus, in the U.S. state of Washington.

Artworks in the building include an untitled painting by Ronnie Tjampitjinpa and Corrupt OS (Portrait of John Stanley Ford) by Anthony White.

References

External links 

 The Jim and Janet Sinegal Center for Science and Innovation at Seattle University

Buildings and structures in Seattle
Seattle University campus